Turntables of the Night is a short story by Terry Pratchett.

It was written in 1989, and first published in Hidden Turnings, an anthology of short stories edited by Diana Wynne Jones. It was later republished as part of The Flying Sorcerers, an anthology of humorous short stories edited by Peter Haining.

The story is narrated by a man who is the friend of an avid record collector named Wayne. Wayne and the narrator begin an unsuccessful business as disc jockeys. Later, the narrator describes the night that Wayne was taken by Death.

External links
 
Full text of Turntables of the night

Discworld short stories
Fantasy short stories
1989 short stories